USS Providence may refer to:

, a 12-gun ship originally named Katy, taken into service in 1775 and destroyed in 1779 to forestall capture by the British
, launched in 1776 and captured by the British in 1780
, built in 1776, fought during the Battle of Valcour Island, and was scuttled to prevent capture
, the light cruiser CL-82 from 1945 to 1949, then converted to a guided missile cruiser and in service as such from 1959 to 1973
, the original name of the  nuclear attack submarine 
, a  nuclear attack submarine commissioned in 1985.

United States Navy ship names